Montezuma Island is an island in Suisun Bay, an embayment of San Francisco Bay, and downstream of the Sacramento–San Joaquin River Delta. It is part of Sacramento County, California, and not managed by any reclamation district. It is labeled "Burnett Island" on an 1850 survey map of the San Francisco Bay area made by Cadwalader Ringgold, and shown (unlabeled) on an 1854 map of the area by Henry Lange.

References

Brewer Island

Islands of Sacramento County, California
Islands of the Sacramento–San Joaquin River Delta
Islands of Suisun Bay
Islands of Northern California